There are 95 listed buildings (Swedish: byggnadsminne) in Jämtland County.

Berg Municipality

Bräcke Municipality

Härjedalen Municipality

Krokom Municipality

Ragunda Municipality

Strömsund Municipality

Åre Municipality

Östersund Municipality

External links
  Bebyggelseregistret

Listed buildings in Sweden